Husain Ali Al-Sayyad (born 14 January 1988) is a Bahraini handball player for Al-Najma and the Bahraini national team.

He participated at the 2017 World Men's Handball Championship.

Along with Noor Yussuf Abdulla, he was flagbearer of Bahrain at the 2020 Summer Olympics. In handball tournament, he and his teammates surprisingly managed to qualify for the quarterfinals.

References

External links 
 

1988 births
Living people
Bahraini male handball players
Expatriate handball players
Bahraini expatriate sportspeople in Saudi Arabia
Asian Games medalists in handball
Asian Games silver medalists for Bahrain
Asian Games bronze medalists for Bahrain
Medalists at the 2014 Asian Games
Medalists at the 2018 Asian Games
Handball players at the 2010 Asian Games
Handball players at the 2014 Asian Games
Handball players at the 2018 Asian Games
Olympic handball players of Bahrain
Handball players at the 2020 Summer Olympics